Elysium is an unincorporated community in Bastrop County, located in the U.S. state of Texas. It is located within the Greater Austin metropolitan area.

History
A post office was established at Elysium in 1896 and remained in operation until 1901. It continued to be featured on county maps in 1981, but there were no buildings at the site.

Geography

Education
The community of Elysium is served by the Bastrop Independent School District.

References

Unincorporated communities in Bastrop County, Texas
Unincorporated communities in Texas